Hanna Shvaiba (born 14 March 2000) is a Belarusian female rhythmic gymnast.

Career

Junior
She was part of Belarusian junior group that competed at the 2015 European Junior Championships and won silver medal in the Group All-around and gold in 5 Balls.

References

External links 
 
 

2000 births
Living people
Belarusian rhythmic gymnasts
Gymnasts from Minsk
Gymnasts at the 2019 European Games
European Games gold medalists for Belarus
European Games bronze medalists for Belarus
European Games medalists in gymnastics
Medalists at the Rhythmic Gymnastics European Championships
21st-century Belarusian women